Tshabalala is a southern African surname and can refer to the following:

People

Sport 
 Daniel Tshabalala (born 1977), football player.
 Evelina Tshabalala (born 1965), marathon runner and mountaineer.
 Siphiwe Tshabalala (born 1984), football player.
 Thandi Tshabalala (born 1984), cricket player.
 Vincent Tshabalala (1942–2017), golfer.

Entertainment 
 Mandoza (1978–2018), stage name of singer Mduduzi Tshabalala.
 Tokollo Tshabalala, musician.
 Velile Tshabalala (born 1984), British actress of Zimbabwean descent.
 Xolile Tshabalala (born 1977), South African actress
 Zwelithini G. Tshabalala (born 1989), Song writer, musical artist from South Africa.
 Tschabalala Self (born 1990), artist.

Other 
 Manto Tshabalala-Msimang (1940–2009), minister of health (1999–2008).

Other usage 
 Schuks Tshabalala's Survival Guide to South Africa, a 2010 African film.

Bantu-language surnames